Arlöv Church is a church in Arlöv, Burlöv Municipality in the Swedish province Skåne. The Neo-Gothic church was built in 1900 to house a growing congregation.

History
The church was built in 1900 and was intended to replace Burlöv Old Church, a nearby medieval church which had become to small for the growing congregation. Discussions about building a new church had been initiated already in 1870. When it was inaugurated in 1900, its Neo-Gothic style was already falling out of fashion.

Architecture
The church was designed by architect  in a Neo-Gothic style with some details influenced by Art Nouveau. The building material is yellow bricks and the church consists of a western tower, nave, transepts and a pentagonal choir. Inside, most of the furnishings including the Neo-Gothic altarpiece date from the time of construction. The north transept houses the organ. The altar is from 1963. The architecture has been described as being of high quality for its time and standards.

References

External links

Churches in Skåne County
Churches in the Diocese of Lund